Jens Sørensen may refer to:

 Jens Sørensen (canoeist) (born 1949), Danish canoeist
 Jens Sørensen (cyclist) (born 1941), Danish cyclist